The  Military Bishopric of Colombia is a Latin Church military ordinariate of the Catholic Church. Immediately exempt to the Holy See, it provides pastoral care to Catholics serving in the Colombian Armed Forces and their families.

History
It was first established as a military vicariate on 13 October 1949, with the first military vicar was appointed on 14 July 1950. It was elevated to a military ordinariate on 21 July 1986. The military ordinary's seat is located at the Military Cathedral of Jesus Christ Redeemer (Catedral Castrense Jesucristo Redentor) in the city of Bogotá.

Office holders

Military vicars
 Crisanto Luque Sánchez (appointed 14 July 1950 – died 7 May 1959); elevated to Cardinal in 1953
 Luis Concha Córdoba (appointed 19 May 1959 – retired 29 July 1972); elevated to Cardinal in 1961
 Aníbal Muñoz Duque (appointed 30 July 1972 – retired 7 June 1985); elevated to Cardinal in 1973
 Mario Revollo Bravo (appointed 25 June 1984 – resigned 7 June 1985); future Cardinal (elevated in 1988)
 Víctor Manuel López Forero (appointed 7 June 1985 – became military ordinary 21 July 1986); see below

Military ordinaries
 Víctor Manuel López Forero (appointed 21 July 1986 – translated to the Archdiocese of Nueva Pamplona 21 June 1994); see above
 Alvaro Raúl Jarro Tobos (appointed 24 June 1997 – resigned 19 January 2001)
 Fabio Suescún Mutis (appointed 19 January 2001 – retired 7 December 2020)
 Víctor Manuel Ochoa Cadavid (incumbent, appointed 7 December 2020)

See also

Roman Catholicism in Colombia

References

External links
 Obispado Castrense de Colombia (GCatholic.org)

Christian organizations established in 1949
Colombia
Colombia
Military of Colombia